The Rémire Sports and Cultural Club (French: Association Sportive et Culturelle Remire), or simply known as ASC Rémire or Rémire is a Guianan football club based in Remire-Montjoly. The club competes in the Ligue de Guyane, the top tier of French Guianan football. 

The club was founded in 1974, and play their home matches in the 1,500-capacity, Stade Municipal Dr. Edmard Lama, which is located near Remire-Montjoly. The primary colors for the club are orange and black.

References

External links 
 LFG Club Profile

Football clubs in French Guiana